The Iraq Stock Exchange (ISX), formerly the Baghdad Stock Exchange, is a stock exchange in Baghdad, Iraq. It was established by the Coalition Provisional Authority (CPA) Order No. 74 as a sui generis independent non-profit organization on April 18, 2004. This order also created the Iraq Securities Commission and an Iraq Depositary. The stock exchange was part of the development of the country from a non-transparent centrally planned economy to a free market economy through a dynamic private sector.

The Iraq Stock Exchange was incorporated and began operations on June 24, 2004. It operates under the oversight of the Iraq Securities Commission, an independent commission modeled after the U.S. Securities and Exchange Commission. This body, which supervises the Board of Governors, initially served as the bridge between the country's previous state-owned stock exchange and the new independent exchange. June Reed is an American adviser to the stock exchange.

Background 
Before the 2003 invasion of Iraq, the country's stock exchange was called the Baghdad Stock Exchange and was operated by the Iraqi Ministry of Finance. Now it is a self-regulated organization similar to the New York Stock Exchange, owned by the 50 or so member brokerages. 

As of 2005, the ISX was Iraq's only stock exchange. It opened in 2004 with 15 companies, and now lists more than 100 companies. Turnover of shares in 2005 was approximately $5 million USD per trading session. Major stocks included Bank of Baghdad, Baghdad Soft Drinks Co, Iraqi Tufted Carpets Co, Hader Marble, and Altherar Agriculture.

Aswat al-Iraq news agency covers every trading session with reports published on the web in English and Arabic.

Growth

Originally, trading was with pen and paper. Buyers shouted at or called into their brokers, who stood near their whiteboards that listed each company's share buy and sell price.

Trading was suspended for several months in 2006 due to violence, and is subject to power outages.

In 2006, 92 trading sessions were held (an average of 2 per week), 57 billion shares were traded (at a value of 146 billion dinars), and 38,000 trades were consummated. The trading floor is currently open six hours a week: Sunday, Tuesday, and Thursday from 10:00 a.m. to 12:00 noon.

The ISX opened to foreign investors on August 2, 2007. It has been unaffected by the Economic crisis of 2008.

On April 19, 2009, the ISX switched to electronic trading. Currently, only five companies are available for electronic trading, but more will be added over the next few months.

In the first quarter of 2018, the ISX became one of the world's top performers due to the influx of investors encouraged by the defeat of the Islamic state. Companies listed on the market increased by 10 percent, anticipating economic recovery due to recent developments. This is particularly notable since the performance defied the violent swings experienced by global markets in the same period. The ISX, however, still faces a number of challenges, which include political instability as demonstrated by the 7 percent loss in value during the May election, sporadic conflicts, and the price of oil, among other economic grievances. 

The Iraq stock Exchange is a member of the Federation of Euro-Asian Stock Exchanges.

See also

 Economy of Iraq
 List of Asian stock exchanges
 Development Fund for Iraq
 2010 Baghdad church attack

References

External links
 Iraq Stock Exchange Guide
 Official Iraq Stock Exchange homepage
 IraqiXchange – Iraqi Market Research

Stock exchanges in the Middle East
Economy of Iraq
Stock exchanges in Asia
Companies of Iraq
Organizations based in Baghdad